Teamsters Canada is a Canadian trade union affiliated with the International Brotherhood of Teamsters. Although the Teamsters have been present in Canada since 1903, Teamsters Canada was only established in 1976. The organization represents 125,000 workers in all industries. It is the largest transportation union in the country, and the largest private sector union under federal jurisdiction.

François Laporte officially began his tenure in 2015 as president of Teamsters Canada. He was sworn in by International Brotherhood of Teamsters (IBT) General President James P. Hoffa, General Secretary-Treasurer Ken Hall and other members of the IBT General Executive Board.

Teamsters Canada Rail Conference  
In 2004, the Canadian branches of both the Brotherhood of Locomotive Engineers and the Brotherhood of Maintenance of Way Employes voted to merge with the Teamsters Canada. Today there are over 16,000 members of Teamsters Canada work in the rail industry who are represented by the Teamsters Canada Rail Conference.

See also 

 International Brotherhood of Teamsters
 Canadian Labour Congress

References

External links
 Teamsters Canada Official Website
 Teamsters Canada Rail Conference
 International Brotherhood of Teamsters
 TCRC Division 76 Winnipeg
 TCRC CTY CP East
 TCRC Division 660 Toronto

Canadian Labour Congress
Trade unions in Quebec
Laval, Quebec
International Brotherhood of Teamsters